Kamhi Point (‘Nos Kamhi’ \'nos kam-'hi\) is the sharp rocky point on the northwest coast of Alexander Island in Antarctica projecting 450 m westwards into Lazarev Bay south of the terminus of Oselna Glacier.

The feature is named after Rafael Moshe Kamhi (1870-1970), a leader of the Bulgarian liberation movement in Macedonia.

Location
British mapping in 1991.

Maps
 British Antarctic Territory. Scale 1:250000 topographic map. Sheet SR19-20/5. APC UK, 1991
 Antarctic Digital Database (ADD). Scale 1:250000 topographic map of Antarctica. Scientific Committee on Antarctic Research (SCAR). Since 1993, regularly upgraded and updated

References
 Bulgarian Antarctic Gazetteer. Antarctic Place-names Commission. (details in Bulgarian, basic data in English)
 Kamhi Point. SCAR Composite Gazetteer of Antarctica

External links
 Kamhi Point. Copernix satellite image

Headlands of Alexander Island
Bulgaria and the Antarctic